Callimedusa tomopterna, the tiger-striped tree frog, is a species of frog in the subfamily Phyllomedusinae. It is found in northern South America in the Upper Amazon Basin of Bolivia, Peru, Ecuador, and Colombia, Amazonian Brazil, and the Guianas from southeastern Venezuela to French Guiana. It might represent more than one species.

Callimedusa tomopterna is an arboreal species that occurs in pristine tropical rainforests, usually on trees around temporary to semi-temporary pools during the wet season, but specimens have been also collected in open areas and floodable forests on shrubs and aquatic edges. It is an uncommon species in most parts of its range. It can locally suffer from habitat loss.

Behavior and reproduction
Callimedusa tomopterna are nocturnal and sleep throughout the day. During the nighttime, the males are able to communicate to the females through vocal calls. During the nighttime is when they also search for food. The reproductive aspects reported for the species of this family are marked by the uniqueness of egg deposition, placed on green leaves hanging under standing water, where the tadpoles will complete their development. The lack of availability of sites for reproduction can lead to sites being shared by anuran species, which can sometimes lead to interspecific mating. This is especially seen when males are actively looking for females through satellite behavior or have limited capacity to differentiate between sexes. This is an often-common behavior in many neotropical frogs such as the Callimedusa tomopterna. Studies have shown interspecific amplexus between individuals from two different species: specifically, Callimedusa tomopterna (Tiger-striped Leaf Frog) and Dendropsophus minutus (Lesser Treefrog).

Threats
Clutch Predation

In the Central Amazonia, treefrogs of the genus Phyllomedusa lay their eggs in gelatinous masses on leaves and branches over water. 59% of C. tomopterna clutches are often attacked by predators such as phorid flies (being the majorly responsible for clutch loss), and other unidentified predators. The reason for these clutch predations is mostly due to Anuran eggs being a high-protein energy source for many predators such as insects. They are especially notorious for larvae.

Adult Predation

Adult Callimedusa tomopternas are also highly predated on. Studies have shown that the predation of adult Phyllomedusa tree frogs by the snake species, Leptodeira annulate (cat-eyed snake) reinforces the claim that the toxins that Callimedusa tomopternas are able to secrete for defense are not sufficient enough to protect them from the cat-eyed snakes.

References

tomopterna
Amphibians of Bolivia
Amphibians of Brazil
Amphibians of Colombia
Amphibians of Ecuador
Amphibians of French Guiana
Amphibians of Guyana
Amphibians of Peru
Amphibians of Suriname
Amphibians of Venezuela
Amphibians described in 1868
Taxa named by Edward Drinker Cope
Taxonomy articles created by Polbot